Digital Radio in the Republic of Ireland is broadcast on a number of digital terrestrial, cable and internet platforms. Until the 31 March 2021, official broadcasts of the digital audio broadcasting standard were also available in the state by Raidió Teilifís Éireann (RTÉ) of their full banquet of radio services. DAB broadcasts since April 2021 are now restricted to unlicensed, low powered multiplexes in a small number of locations.

Digital Terrestrial Television 
All of RTE's digital radio services and the private radio service, Radio Maria Ireland are available on Saorview.

Generic DVB receivers generally need mains power, but are typically cheaper than DAB radios. Many portable DAB radio sets have 1/10th to 1/50th of the running time of an AM/FM set, typically giving only 6 hours use. There are also in-dash DVB Terrestrial receivers for cars, though it is illegal for the driver to watch the TV channels. One of the criticisms of digital radio services in Ireland is that they predominately use 128kbps MPEG-1 Audio Layer II audio as a maximum bit rate, replicating the situation found on digital radio in the United Kingdom.

Digital Satellite 
A number of public and private radio services from Ireland are available nationwide on both Saorsat and Sky where 99% of geographic coverage is possible.

Internet Radio 
A number of public and private radio services are available across the state from broadband internet and mobile phone networks receivable on smartphones, Internet radio devices and smart speakers.

Digital Audio Broadcasting 
Digital Audio Broadcasting in Ireland is no longer legally and officially one of the forms of digital radio transmission in the state. Only a small number of unlicensed low powered, small scale DAB multiplexes are running in the state. Areas near the border of Northern Ireland can receive over-spill reception of UK national, Northern Ireland local and small scale multiplexes.

DAB was launched to the public on 30 November 2006, with a number of trials taking place in 1998, 2001 and 2006. Before April 2021, 52% of Ireland's population - mainly in Counties Cork, Limerick and the North East - could receive permanent DAB services. Geographic coverage on a portable or car radio was much less. The service began to be marketed in May 2007 by a collective of commercial broadcasters, digitalradio.ie; and receivers to this day are still sold by most major electronics retailers.

Since 2010, a number of privately run trial broadcasts have been made.

Former National Multiplexes

DAB Ireland Mux1 (RTE - 2006 to 2021)
The first national public service multiplex operated on Block 12C (227.360 MHz) by RTE from just five transmitters: Three Rock Co. Dublin, Kippure Co. Wicklow, Clermont Carn Co. Louth, Spur Hill Cork, and Woodcock Hill Limerick. Hence the service was only available in parts of Ireland. Its line-up has varied heavily since its launch - initially on 1 January 2006. All stations were provided by RTÉ. It carried the following stations:

 RTÉ Radio 1, 128 kbit/s Stereo
 RTÉ Radio 1 Extra, 64 kbit/s Mono (part-time service, used bandwidth from Chill)
 RTÉ 2fm, 128 kbit/s Stereo
 RTÉ lyric fm, 160 kbit/s Stereo
 RTÉ Raidió na Gaeltachta, 112 kbit/s Stereo
 RTÉ Gold, 128 kbit/s Stereo
 RTÉ 2XM, 128 kbit/s Stereo
 RTÉ Junior, 128 kbit/s Stereo (07:00-21:00, timeshared a slot with RTÉ Chill). Drops to 96kbit/s Mono when required
 RTÉ Chill, 128 kbit/s Stereo (21:00-07:00, timeshared a slot with RTÉ Junior). Drops to 96kbit/s Mono when required
 RTÉ Pulse, 128 kbit/s Stereo.

It was proposed to close the RTÉ DAB service as well as the Digital only RTE radio channels as part of the November 2019 cost saving plan. This proposed closure was set to take place in April 2020 but was delayed pending review through the outcome of a commissioned report.

In March 2021, RTÉ announced that it is to cease transmission of its radio services on the Digital Audio Broadcast (DAB) network on 31 March 2021. A report commissioned by the broadcaster found that just 0.5% of adults in Ireland listen to radio via DAB while 77% of adults in Ireland listen on FM.

DAB Ireland Mux2

(2007–08)
No longer operating since November 2008, this multiplex launched in mid-March 2007 and operated from Three Rock Mountain and Clermont Carn on Block 12A (223.936 MHz). It carried ten services - four stations supplied by Communicorp, two by Digital Audio Productions, two by UTV Radio, and two privately held. As of July 2008, it consisted of:
 All 80s, 128kbit/s Stereo
 Dublin's 98FM, 128 kbit/s Stereo
 FM104, 128 kbit/s Stereo
 Mocha, 128kbit/s Stereo
 Newstalk, 64 kbit/s Mono
 Phantom FM, 128 kbit/s Stereo
 Q102, 128 kbit/s Stereo
 Radio Kerry, 96 kbit/s Mono
 Today FM, 128 kbit/s Stereo
 SPIN 1038, 128 kbit/s Stereo
 Raidió Rí-Rá

Radio stations licensed by the broadcasting commission of Ireland ceased broadcasting on Ireland's second digital radio multiplex (Mux 2) on Sunday, 30 November 2008.  The stations were broadcasting on Mux 2 as part of a digital radio trial.  RTÉ continues to broadcast on the RTÉ multiplex. ComReg and the BCI are currently exploring regulatory frameworks for digital radio multiplex licensing and broadcast licences.

(DB Digital Broadcasting - 2012 to 2017) 
DB Digital Broadcasting launched a national multiplex in selected areas of Ireland in July 2012. Plans to expand to Limerick were dropped in 2014. The multiplex closed on 30 June 2017 after a lack of enthusiasm for DAB from the commercial sector and after its licence expired from ComReg. The operator is attempting to relaunch a national service after the announcement of the closure of the first national multiplex.

Former trial multiplexes

South-East (TOTAL-DAB) DAB trials (2010 to 2012) 
DAB and DAB+ trials were begun in April 2010 in the South-East area of Ireland on channel 9B (204.64 MHz) by Total Broadcast Consultants Ltd, a broadcast engineering company. The company initially obtained a 1-year test and trial licence from ComReg to perform tests from sites, initially just in Waterford City. But from mid May, the trial multiplex was expanded to cover much of the South East of Ireland via a high site in the Blackstairs Mountains, providing coverage in Co. Wexford, Co. Carlow, Co. Kilkenny and East Co. Waterford. In March 2011, a 1-year extension was granted. This was the first DAB multiplex in Ireland to be operated by an independent/private organisation (RTÉ NL operating previous multiplexes), and the first known broadcasts of DAB+ content in Ireland. In addition to all local and regional radio stations, it was carrying several stations previously unavailable in the region. Past trial participants have included Christmas FM, Zenith Classic Rock & Raidió Rí-Rá. 
 4fm, 160kbit/s Stereo
 Beat 102 103, 192kbit/s Stereo
 Sunshine, 128kbit/s Stereo
 KCLR 96FM, 48kbit/s DAB+ Stereo
 Phantom FM, 128kbit/s Stereo
 Radio Nova, 192kbit/s Stereo
 RTÉ 2XM, 72kbit/s DAB+ Stereo
 South East Radio, 88kbit/s DAB+ Stereo
 talkSPORT, 56kbit/s Mono
 Tipp FM, 56kbit/s DAB+ Stereo
 UCB Ireland, 32kbit/s AAC+
 WLR FM, 64kbit/s AAC+ Stereo

Dublin 2018 trial 
A test service in Dublin served parts of the city on Channels 5A and 5B carrying both RTE and Independent local radio services from both Dublin and Cork.

Cork City 2018/19 DAB Trial (éirdab)
A small scale DAB trial launched in August 2018 in Cork City, Ireland on channel 11A (216.928 MHz).  It was operated by Viamux Ltd (éirdab), a DAB/DAB+ digital radio solutions company. éirdab has a 1-year test and trial licence from Comreg to perform tests from a site in Cork City.  éirdab has invited all local and regional radio stations to join the multiplex.  It also carried stations previously unavailable to listeners in the area. Stations include: 
 Radio Maria, 128kbit/s Stereo
 United Christian Broadcasters, 128kbit/s Stereo
 Juice Cork, 192kbit/s Stereo

Current unlicensed DAB multiplexes 
A small number of unlicensed independent DAB multiplexes are available in a few locations.

Ireland FreeDAB Network (FreeDAB)
The FreeDAB network carried a number of low-powered multiplexes in Cork, Dublin, the north and north east of Ireland and Sligo. The broadcaster was raided by the Garda in 2020 but has since resumed broadcasting in Cork, Dublin, Sligo, Waterford, Dundalk, Limerick,

See also 

 Radio in the Republic of Ireland

References

External links

Digital Terrestrial Television Platform 

 Saorview

DAB Multiplex Operators 

 dB Digital Broadcasting
 FreeDAB

Other sites 

 DAB Ensembles Worldwide - technical information about DAB transmissions in Ireland

Digital audio broadcasting multiplexes
Radio in the Republic of Ireland
DAB Multiplex
Digital radio